Step 2 Clinical Skills (Step 2 CS) of the United States Medical Licensing Examination (USMLE) was an exam administered to medical students/graduates who wish to become licensed physicians in the U.S.  It is similar to the COMLEX-USA Level 2-PE exam, taken by osteopathic medical students/graduates who seek licensure as physicians in the U.S. For US medical students, the exam fee is $1,300 (as of 2020). For medical students at non-US medical schools, the tests cost is higher—currently $1,535. These fees do not include costs associated with travel and lodging to take the test. Historically, US students have taken Step 2 CS late in their senior year, prior to graduation. However, now that more residency programs require students to record a passing score, many US medical schools recommend students take Step 2 CS in the fall of their senior year.

On May 26, 2020, in response to the COVID-19 pandemic, the USMLE "suspended Step 2 CS test administrations for the next 12-18 months."

On January 26, 2021, the USMLE announced that the work to relaunch a modified form USMLE Step 2 CS had been discontinued citing rapidly evolving medical education and changes in other standardized exams, like computer-based simulations in Step 3, that would supplement medical students' education in place of Step 2 CS.

Structure 

The USMLE Step 2CS exam consists of a series of patient encounters in which the examinee must see standardized patients (SPs), take a history, do a physical examination, determine differential diagnoses, and then write a patient note based on their determinations.  The topics covered are common outpatient or Emergency Room visits which are encountered in the fields of internal medicine, surgery, psychiatry, pediatrics, and obstetrics and gynecology.  Examinees are expected to investigate the simulated patient's chief complaint, as well as obtain a thorough assessment of their past medical history, medications, allergies, social history (including alcohol, tobacco, drug use, sexual practices, etc.), and family history. Usually, examinees have one telephone encounter, speaking to an SP through a microphone during which there is no physical exam component.

Examinees are allowed 15 minutes to complete each encounter and 10 minutes for the patient note for a single patient encounter.  The patient note is slightly different from a standard SOAP note.  For the exam note, the examinees will document the pertinent facts relating to the history of present illness as well as elements of the past medical history, medication history, allergies, social history, family history, and physical exam.  The examinees will then state up to 3 differential diagnoses relating to the simulated patient's symptoms, and tests or procedures to investigate the simulated patient's complaints. The examinees should also list pertinent positive and negative findings to support each potential diagnosis. The examinees will not recommend any specific treatments in the note in contrast to a true clinic SOAP note (i.e., IV fluids, antibiotics, or other medications). Over the course of an 8-hour exam day, the examinees complete 12 such encounters. Examinees are required to type patient notes on a computer.

USMLE Step 2 CS replaced the former ECFMG Clinical Skills Assessment (CSA) effective June 14, 2004. The last administration of the ECFMG Clinical Skills Assessment (CSA) took place on April 16, 2004. When the CSA first started it was strictly for Foreign Medical Graduates while US graduates were not required to do it. That was considered a double standard in the US medical licensing process. Later the CSA was replaced with the USMLE step 2 CS and became inclusive to all medical graduates.

Grading 
The test was graded on a pass/fail basis, without any numerical score associated with it (as opposed to the other parts of the USMLE series). Examinees were scored on three separate subcomponents: Communication and Interpersonal Skills (CIS), Spoken English Proficiency (SEP), and Integrated Clinical Encounter (ICE). Each of the three subcomponents must be passed in a single administration in order to achieve a passing performance on Step 2 CS.

 Communication and Interpersonal Skills (CIS) - includes assessment of the patient-centered communication skills of fostering the relationship, gathering information, providing information, helping the patient make decisions, and supporting emotions. CIS performance is assessed by the standardized patients, who record these skills using a checklist based on observable behaviors.
 Spoken English Proficiency (SEP) -  includes assessment of clarity of spoken English communication within the context of the doctor-patient encounter (for example, pronunciation, word choice, and minimizing the need to repeat questions or statements). SEP performance is assessed by the standardized patients using a global rating scale, where the rating is based upon the frequency of pronunciation or word choice errors that affect comprehension and the amount of listener effort required to understand the examinee's questions and responses.
Integrated Clinical Encounter (ICE) -  includes assessments of both data gathering and data interpretation skills. Scoring for this subcomponent consists of a checklist completed by the standardized patients for the physical examination portion of the encounter, and global ratings provided by trained physician raters. The patient note raters provide ratings on the documented summary of the findings of the patient encounter (history and physical examination), diagnostic impressions, justification of the potential diagnoses, and initial patient diagnostic studies.

Exam centers 

Before its retirement, the exam could be taken in the U.S. at five Clinical Skills Evaluation Centers (CSEC), located in:
Atlanta, Georgia
Chicago, Illinois
Houston, Texas
Los Angeles, California
Philadelphia, Pennsylvania

Controversy 
The Step 2 CS exam was added to the USMLE series in 2004 by the NBME and FSMB. However, the test garnered criticism for its high exam fee and need to travel to one of five testing sites. Even before the exam was rolled out, the American Medical Association raised serious concerns with the exam, both because it failed to provide students feedback and room for remediation and because there was no proof the exam actually accomplished its mission of protecting the public.

Beginning in 2004, the USMLE program undertook a comprehensive review of the USMLE, referred to as the Comprehensive Review of USMLE (CRU). The review was overseen by the committee to Evaluate the USMLE Program (CEUP),  which was composed of students, residents, clinicians, and members of the licensing, graduate, and undergraduate education communities. The goal of the committee was to determine if the mission and purpose of USMLE were effectively and efficiently supported by the current design, structure, and format of the USMLE. This process was to be guided, in part, by an analysis of information gathered from stakeholders, and was to result in recommendations to USMLE governance. The CEUP worked from 2006 to early 2008.  The CEUP's final report states that "none of the feedback (received from other stakeholders) seemed to indicate that USMLE is broken, but there was considerable interest in enhancing and improving the program." Additionally, the report states that "there appeared to be very strong reactions to Step 2 CS, and CEUP felt that survey and stakeholder meeting data on this component needed to be interpreted in a special way by attempting to separate (but still be attentive to) issues related to the mechanics and costs of Step 2 CS versus the value of what the exam is intended to measure. On the issue of mechanics and costs, CEUP recognized that USMLE must be very attentive to the burden put on examinees by this testing format and that the impact on examinees must be considered when proposing future directions. Concerning the skills measured by Step 2 CS, there seemed to be legitimate concerns about content. Many people wanted to see the exam begin to assess whether the examinee can detect and interpret abnormal findings and handle challenging communication issues. There was a frequently expressed sentiment that this exam was ripe for enhancement and that many of the more advanced communication skills and other competencies could be assessed through this vehicle." In response to the feedback gathered, the CEUP recommended that "the assessment of clinical skills remain a component of USMLE, but that USMLE consider ways to further enhance the testing methods currently used, in order to address additional skills im-portant to medical practice. It is also recommended that the administrative challenges and costs to examinees associated with related testing formats be given substantial weight in the consideration of future changes."

In 2013, an article published in the New England Journal of Medicine raised concerns about the value of the exam. The authors calculated that the test fee alone cost students $36 million annually, and that the cost of detecting a single student who failed the exam on back-to-back attempts was $1.1 million.  A letter to the editor from the leadership of the NBME and the FSMB in response to the article highlighted the need to view the value of the Step 2 CS in terms other than just cost; specifically, they state that, "Although (the authors') interest in cost is consistent with the current climate in health care, the 'value' referenced in their title is a function of quality as well as cost. They fail to fully consider the long-term effect of this assessment program on patient safety and satisfaction, societal expectations, and effective medical education." They also note that inclusion of Step 2 CS in the USMLE "brought the USMLE closer to meeting the expectations of the public that physicians exhibit competence in communicating with and examining patients."

In February 2016, a group of students at Harvard Medical School launched a national petition calling for an end to Step 2 CS. Since the petition opened, it has collected over 20,000 signatures from medical students and physicians from all over the country.

In May 2016, the Massachusetts Medical Society and the Michigan State Medical Society have passed resolutions calling for the elimination of Step 2 CS.

In June 2016, the Arizona Medical Association and the AMA - Medical Student Section passed resolutions also calling for the elimination of Step 2 CS.  All four resolutions were introduced to the American Medical Association's 2016 Annual House of Delegates meeting, and were combined and adopted as a substitute, single resolution by a unanimous voice vote on 6/15/2016.  The adopted language calls for the AMA to work with the FSMB, NBME, state medical societies, and state medical boards to pursue the transition from the Step 2 CS exam to a school-administered clinical skills exam as a licensure requirement.

March 16, 2020, USMLE cancelled all appointments for the USMLE STEP 2 CS exam due to the COVID-19 pandemic. Scheduling functionality for the exam has also been cancelled. It remains to be seen what actions will be taken by the respective authorities given the fluid nature of the pandemic and the person-to-person nature of this exam.

On May 26, 2020, USMLE has "decided to suspend Step 2 CS test administrations for the next 12-18 months."

The USMLE announced on January 26, 2021, that "[they] have decided to discontinue Step 2 CS."

See also 
USMLE Step 1
USMLE Step 2 CK
USMLE Step 3
COMLEX, the counterpart examination for osteopathic medical students.

References

External links 
Official Webpage of the USMLE about the Step 2CS
ECFMG Official Website
USMLE Recommended Material

United States Medical Licensing Examination